Robert Scott Campbell (born April 15, 1962) is a former professional American football player who played quarterback for six seasons in the National Football League (NFL) for the Pittsburgh Steelers and Atlanta Falcons. He appeared in 45 games in the NFL, starting 13. Campbell played college football at Purdue University. He backed up Mark Herrmann for one season, then started over Jim Everett for the next three years.

The Boilermakers' cumulative record during his time as a starter was 11-21-1 Overall, 9-16-1 Big Ten.  The Boilers never finished higher than 6th in the league during this time.

College statistics
1981: 2,686 yards with 18 TD vs 13 INT in 11 games.
1982: 2,626 yards with 14 TD vs 12 INT in 11 games.
1983: 2,031 yards with 12 TD vs 16 INT in 11 games.

Personal life
Campbell is currently a real estate broker and owner of Brownstone Realty in Hershey, Pennsylvania.

His father, Ken Campbell is an American Football League (AFL) veteran who appeared in one game with the New York Titans during the 1960 season.

References

1962 births
Living people
American football quarterbacks
Atlanta Falcons players
Pittsburgh Steelers players
Purdue Boilermakers football players
People from Hershey, Pennsylvania
Players of American football from Pennsylvania